Suta, Sūta, Šuta or Şuţa may refer to:

People
 Šuta, Egyptian commissioner
 Jocelino Suta, French rugby union player
 Khassaraporn Suta, Thai weightlifter
 Miroslav Šuta, Czech environmental expert and writer

Places
 Şuta, a village in Muereasca Commune, Vâlcea County, Romania
 Şuţa Seacă, a village in Raciu Commune, Dâmboviţa County, Romania
 Șuța River, a tributary of the Sabar River
 The historical name for Sutamarchán, Boyacá Department, Colombia

Others
 Sūta refers both to the bards of Puranic stories and to a mixed caste
 Oha Suta, Japanese children's television show
 Suta (snake), a genus of venomous snakes
 Suta (album), a studio album by Paraziţii
 SUTA dumping, a practice used by some companies doing business in the U.S.A. to circumvent paying unemployment insurance taxes